G4 are a four-piece British vocal troupe who first came to prominence when they finished second in Series 1 of The X Factor in 2004, and are known for their operatic delivery of modern pop songs. Originally a barbershop quartet, the members met at the Guildhall School of Music and Drama, from which the name G4, standing for "Guildhall 4", derives.

In 2007 the band disbanded, citing disagreements among the members, but reunited in 2014 to celebrate their ten-year anniversary with a number of concerts nationwide, leading to a new album for Christmas 2015.

The group currently consists of original members tenor Jonathan Ansell and baritone Mike Christie, with Lewis Raines joining after former low tenor Ben Thapa left in 2018, and Duncan Sandilands replacing former bass singer Nick Ashby in 2019.

History

2004:The X Factor
In 2004, shortly after Stiff replaced original bass Tom Lowe, G4 spontaneously applied to The X Factor with the intention of using the show to obtain a quote on posters for upcoming concerts and gain publicity - prior to this they performed as buskers during their free time at college to earn extra money and gain experience. Although the band members originally took it in turns to sing lead, Simon Cowell - who had dismissed them as "fat buskers" - suggested that Ansell be promoted to the group's frontman. Mentored by Louis Walsh, they reached the final, and to date G4 remain one of only two classical-based acts to compete in the live shows, the other being Welsh baritone Rhydian - coincidentally, both placed second in Series 1 and 4 respectively, but outsold the eventual winners. Cowell, who had mentored Series 1 champion Steve Brookstein, later admitted that G4 were the real winners of the competition.

Despite their success on the show, G4 later branded The X Factor as a pantomime due to staged conflict between the judges which overshadowed the contestants. Bass singer Stiff also stated "Backstage Simon would say we were great, but then on camera say nothing. I don't think he wanted us to win and by choosing what he said on camera he knew he had the power to sway votes. He is the ringmaster". In 2013, none of G4's singles appeared on The X Factor – Greatest Hits album, despite their status as one of the biggest-selling acts in the history of the show.

X Factor performances

2005: G4 and G4 and Friends
After The X Factor, G4 signed a £1.5 million album deal with Sony BMG. Having not been picked up by Cowell, Sony A&R Nick Raphael said that his label decided to pursue the band, stating: "We felt that they were the best act on the show." With the rules of The X Factor allowing any non-winning band or artist to sign with anyone, Sony competed with Universal and EMI for G4's signatures. Raphael believed their mentor-turned-manager Walsh accepted Sony BMG's advances because the company had a plan of how to work with them as opposed to their competitors who merely had a desire to sign the band. In addition, Sony also had a definitive date to release any albums and merchandise, as well as organised structure to make their records. During this time, Ansell, who had previously auditioned to be a member of Il Divo, was offered the role of Prince Tamino in Kenneth Branagh's modern adaptation of The Magic Flute, but turned it down to remain with the band.

The debut album, G4, was released on 28 February 2005, and contained mostly classical covers of popular pop songs, most of which had been performed on The X Factor like "Everybody Hurts", with a few opera tunes such as "Nessun Dorma" and "Flower Duet". It reached #1 in time for Mother's Day weekend 2005, and sold over 245,000 copies in the first week. Their debut single, "Bohemian Rhapsody", was released on 14 March 2005, and entered the charts at #9. Following the success of G4, G4 embarked on a 25-day arena tour.

G4 & Friends was released on 28 November 2005, and followed the same format as their first album, but also included collaborations with Lesley Garrett and Robin Gibb, both of whom were special guests during the group's UK tour. Their recording of "Miss You Nights" with original artist Cliff Richard was also featured on the latter's album Two's Company The Duets. G4 & Friends entered the charts at #6, and while not as successful as their first album, it was still certified platinum. Their version of "When a Child is Born", also from the album, was originally in the running to become christmas number one for 2005, but was disqualified due to the inclusion of free stickers in the CD case.

In 2005, G4 also launched both the Wonder Mum competition - posing for a photoshoot with each of their own mothers - and the similarly named G Force ride at Drayton Manor Theme Park, and presented a show on Classic FM which showcased their favourite pieces of classical music, along with their own recordings.

2006: Act Three
G4's third album Act Three was released on 27 November 2006. Being released in the same week as the third album by the similar band Il Divo, Act Three peaked at #21 in the UK charts with first week sales of 37,487. The album included a collaboration with Stephen Gately on the track "No Matter What", Gately having sung the lead on the original version of the song with his band Boyzone, and an orchestral arrangement of Gnarls Barkley's "Crazy." Act Three was the last album to feature Stiff's voice singing bass.

During this period, G4 traveled to the SOS Children's Villages in Ghana on behalf of Classic Response, completed the London Marathon, and made a special appearance at the 4th of July party at Winfield House where they sang "The Star-Spangled Banner". Towards the end of the year, embarked on a nationwide cathedral tour.

2007: Disbandment
On 5 April 2007, G4 announced on GMTV that they would be splitting after their national tour due to disagreements within the band, with Ansell pursuing a solo career. Tenor Thapa stated: "We did not want to drag on for another couple of years, growing increasingly resentful of each other. We are still friends and we want to stay friends but we won't if we carry on in G4". Ansell also confessed that the group found coping with fame difficult, and being popstars was not the band's lifelong aspiration. They gave their final performance at Romsey on 28 July 2007 before splitting, but briefly reunited when they all performed at Ansell's wedding to Quizmania presenter Debbie King in 2009.

2014–2015: Reunion and G4 Christmas

In November 2014, after announcing via Twitter that they would be reuniting, G4 performed at the Barbican Hall with support from Charlotte Jaconelli. Stiff declined, stating that he wished to focus solely on his opera career, but he was replaced by Nick Ashby, making him the third bass to sing with the group. Originally meant to be a one-night-only concert, G4 later confirmed on The Alan Titchmarsh Show that they would be touring the country in 2015. Prior to this, the group's first official live performance was at the Leeds Christmas Lights Switch-On alongside former X Factor winner Sam Bailey.

In June 2015, G4 announced that they would be releasing their fourth album G4 Christmas via PledgeMusic. This was followed by "Christmas by Candlelight" Tour of eight dates around the UK in Cathedrals and Churches.

2016: Back for Good Tour, G4 Love Songs and Christmas By Candlelight 2016

On 6 September 2016, G4 announced a new PledgeMusic campaign to fund their fifth studio album G4 Love Songs.

2017: Love Songs Album, Live in Concert Tour and Christmas By Candlelight 2017 
On 3 February 2017, G4 released their 5th album, G4 Love Songs. The album launch was held at The Century Club in Soho London, with guest Merrill Osmond. Whilst promoting the album and staying overnight in Birmingham, Jonathan and Mike were mugged while cutting through a park.

2018 

On 19 July Ben Thapa announced on Twitter that he was leaving the group with immediate effect to concentrate on his opera career. G4 announced on Social Media soon after that after a nationwide search Lewis Raines would be taking over from Ben Thapa.

Since that announcement the King's Singers have posted that Nick Ashby will be joining them from 2019.

Solo careers
During the split, Ansell's solo album Tenor at the Movies reached number 1 on the classical chart, making him the youngest tenor to accomplish this feat. In 2012 he was criticised for auditioning for Superstar after it was revealed he was still rehearsing for another musical. Thapa worked with the National Chamber Choir in Dublin before moving back to London, and was in the Scottish Opera's production of Kátya Kabanová. Christie is now a classical composer, having written the opera The Miller's Wife which was shown at the Arcola Theatre in 2013, and Stiff, who returned to Classic FM to present his self-titled music programme has performed in several operas, and has spoken of becoming a lecturer in future.

Members

Current
Jonathan Ansell (2004–present) – high tenor/lead
Mike Christie (2004–present) – baritone
Lewis Raines (2018–present) – low tenor
Duncan Sandilands (2019–present) – bass

Former
Matthew Stiff (2004–2007) – bass
Ben Thapa (2004–2018) – low tenor
Nick Ashby (2014–2019) – bass

Discography

Albums

Singles

EPs

DVDs
Live at the Royal Albert Hall (2005)
The Reunion – Live in Concert (2015)
Live in London - Union Chapel (2017)

References

The X Factor (British TV series) contestants
Pop opera groups
English pop music groups
English vocal groups
English boy bands
Alumni of the Guildhall School of Music and Drama
Musical groups from London
Musical groups established in 2004
Musical groups disestablished in 2007
Musical groups reestablished in 2014
Opera crossover singers
 
Musical quartets